Psara submarginalis is a moth in the family Crambidae. It was described by Aristide Caradja in 1925. It is found in China.

References

Spilomelinae
Moths described in 1925